Blumenau is a city in Santa Catarina, Brazil.

Blumenau may also refer to:
 Blumenau (Winterthur), a part of Winterthur, Zürich, Switzerland
 Blumenau, a former settlement near Stettler, Alberta, Canada
 Blumenau, a part of Engelskirchen, North Rhine-Westphalia, Germany
 Blumenau, a part of Mannheim, Baden-Württemberg, Germany
 Blumenau, a part of Mellenbach-Glasbach, Thuringia, Germany
 Blumenau, a part of Munich, Bavaria, Germany
 Blumenau, a part of Olbernhau, Saxony, Germany
 Blumenau (Wunstorf), a part of Wunstorf, Lower Saxony, Germany
 Heide-Nord/Blumenau, a part of Halle (Saale), Saxony-Anhalt, Germany

In historical contexts, Blumenau, Groß Blumenau or Klein Blumenau may refer to:
 Czarny Kierz, Warmia-Masuria, Poland
 Kremnyovo, Kaliningrad, Russia
 Kwiatuszki Wielkie and Kwiatuszki Małe, Warmia-Masuria, Poland
 Kwietniki, Lower Silesia, Poland
 Kwietnik, Warmia-Masuria, Poland
 Jedlinka Górna, Lower Silesia, Poland
 Lamač, Bratislava, Slovakia (Location of the Battle of Blumenau)
 Květná, Pardubice, Czechia
 Plumlov, Olomouc, Czechia
 Świniary Wielkie and Świniary Małe, Opole, Poland

People with the surname
 Colin Blumenau (born 1956), British writer and theatre director
 F. W. Blumenau, pseudonym of Friedrich Wilhelm August Bratring (1772–1829), German ethnologist and author
 Hermann Blumenau (1819–1899), German pharmacist and founder of Blumenau, Brazil
 Jack Blumenau (born 1986), British actor
 Laurentius Blumenau (died 1484), German Carthusian monk and humanist
 Martin Blumenau (born 1960), Austrian journalist and moderator
 Salomon Blumenau (1825–1904), German Reform Jewish preacher and religion teacher